This is a list of what are intended to be the notable top hotels by country, five or four star hotels, notable skyscraper landmarks or historic hotels which are covered in multiple reliable publications. It should not be a directory of every hotel in every country:

Kazakhstan
Hotel Kazakhstan, Almaty

Kenya

 Fairmont The Norfolk Hotel
 Giraffe Manor, Nairobi
 Lake Naivasha Country Club, Lake Naivasha
 Muthaiga Country Club, Nairobi
 Outspan Hotel, Nyeri
 Stanley Hotel, Nairobi
 Treetops Hotel, Aberdare National Park

Kosovo
Grand Hotel Prishtina, Pristina

Kuwait
 InterContinental Kuwait Downtown, Kuwait City
 JW Marriott Kuwait City, Kuwait City
 Rotana Hotels, Kuwait City
 Safir Hotels & Resorts
 SS Santa Paula, Kuwait City

References

K